The Munididae are a family of squat lobsters, taxonomically separated from the family Galatheidae in 2010.

Description and ecology
The squat lobsters in the family Munididae can be distinguished from other families by the presence of a trispinose frontal edge to the carapace, as well as a central rostrum, and two spines extend forward from above the eyes. Although a few species enter shallow water, the majority of species in the Munididae are deep-water taxa, in contrast to the mostly shallow-water Galatheidae.

Taxonomy
The genera now included in the family Munididae had previously been included in a wider Galatheidae. When originally described , the family contained these genera:

Agononida Baba & de Saint Laurent, 1996
Anomoeomunida Baba, 1993
Anoplonida Baba & de Saint Laurent, 1996
Babamunida Cabezas, Macpherson & Machordom, 2008
Bathymunida Balss, 1914
Cervimunida Benedict, 1902
† Cretagalathea Garassino, De Angeli & Pasini, 2008 – Upper Cretaceous
Crosnierita Macpherson, 1998
Enriquea Baba, 2005
Hendersonida Cabezas & Macpherson, 2014
Heteronida Baba & de Saint Laurent, 1996
† Juracrista Robins, Feldmann & Schweitzer, 2012 – Late Jurassic (Tithonian)
Munida Leach, 1820
Neonida Baba & de Saint Laurent, 1996
Onconida Baba & de Saint Laurent, 1996
Paramunida Baba, 1988
Plesionida Baba & de Saint Laurent, 1996
Pleuroncodes Stimpson, 1860
† Protomunida Beurlen, 1930 – Palaeocene to Eocene
Raymunida Macpherson & Machordom, 2000
Sadayoshia Baba, 1969
Setanida Macpherson, 2006
Tasmanida Ahyong, 2007
Torbenella Baba, 2008

References

External links

Squat lobsters
Extant Late Jurassic first appearances
Decapod families